Sokoine Stadium is a multi-use stadium in the Sisimba ward of Mbeya, Tanzania, owned by the Chama Cha Mapinduzi (CCM) political party.

It is used mostly for football matches and serves as the home venue for Prisons FC and Mbeya City F.C. It holds 20,000 people.

Originally named the Mapinduzi Stadium, it was re-named Sokoine Memorial Stadium in 1984, after the death of Edward Sokoine, the Prime Minister of the Republic of Tanzania.

References and notes

Football venues in Tanzania
Mbeya
Buildings and structures in the Mbeya Region